The YWCA Building is a historic building in Seattle, in the U.S. state of Washington. The structure is listed on the National Register of Historic Places and has been designated a Seattle landmark.

See also
 List of Seattle landmarks
 List of YWCA buildings
 National Register of Historic Places listings in Seattle

References

External links

 

Buildings and structures in Seattle
Downtown Seattle
History of women in Washington (state)
National Register of Historic Places in Seattle
YWCA buildings